Magallanes is a surname. Notable people with the surname include:

 Cristóbal Magallanes Jara, Mexican saint
 Bobby Magallanes, American minor league baseball manager
 Julián Magallanes (born 1986), Argentine footballer
 Nicholas Magallanes, former New York City Ballet principal dancer